In Islam, prophetic medicine is the advice given by the prophet Muhammad with regards to sickness, treatment and hygiene as found in the hadith. It is usually practiced primarily by non-physician scholars who collect and explicate these traditions. Prophetic medicine is distinct from Islamic medicine, which is a broader category encompassing a variety of medical practices rooted in Greek natural philosophy. In practice, prophetic medical traditions encourage not only following Muhammad's teachings, but to search for cures to various ailments as well. The literature of prophetic medicine thus occupies a symbolic role in the elucidation of Islamic identity as constituted by a particular set of relationships to science, medicine, technology and nature. There has historically been a tension in the understanding of the medical narratives of the hadith. Some are unsure whether to treat them the same as the prophet Muhammad's religious pronouncements, or as time-sensitive, culturally situated, and thus not representative of a set of eternal medical truths. This body of knowledge was fully articulated only in the 14th century, at which point it was concerned with reconciling Sunnah (traditions) with the foundations of the Galenic humoral theory that was prevalent at the time in the medical institutions of the Islamicate world. It is nonetheless a tradition with continued modern relevance to this day.

Overview
Prophetic medicine is sometimes casually identified with Unani medicine or traditional medicine, although it is distinguished from some iterations of these and from scientific medicine most predominantly by the former being specifically a collection of advice attributed to Muhammad in the Islamic tradition. It is important to note that medieval interpretations of the hadith were produced in a Galenic medical context, while modern-day versions of prophetic medicine treatments may include recent research findings to frame the importance of the genre. In the hadith, Muhammad recommended the use of honey and hijama (wet cupping) for healing and had generally opposed the use of cauterization for causing "pain and menace to a patient". Other items with beneficial effects attributed to Muhammad, and standard features on traditional medicine in the Islamicate world, include olive oil; dates; miswak as a necessity for oral health and Nigella sativa or "black seed" or "black cumin" and its oils. These items are still sold in Islamic centers or sellers of other Islamic goods.

Muhammad's firm belief in the existence of a cause and a cure for every disease is described in many hadith along the lines of the below:

This belief can be said to be a grounding philosophy of this otherwise loosely defined field, and is said to have encouraged early Muslims to engage in medical research and seek out cures for diseases known to them.

Recommendations

Black seeds

Abu Hurayra quoted Muhammad saying: "Utilize the black seed for without a doubt, it is a cure for all sicknesses aside from death." (Hadith Al-Bukhari 7:591)

Camel urine and milk

	
According to a hadith recorded in the 4th chapter (Wudu''') of Sahih al-Bukhari, Muhammad had used Camel urine to treat people:

The event has also been recorded in Sahih Muslim, History of the Prophets and Kings and Kitāb aṭ-ṭabaqāt al-kabīr. Henna 
According to Hadith compiler Abu Dawood's work Sunan Abu Dawood, Muhammad had advised the application of henna in case of leg pain:

In Ibn Majah's Sunan ibn Majah, Muhammad has been described as using henna for external injuries:

Honey
 
The value of honey is traced to specific mention of its virtues in the Quran, an-Nahl (the Bees) and not just Muhammad. (Quran 68–69) 

The Prophet Muhammad is quoted as, "Healing is in three things: cupping, a gulp of honey or cauterization, (branding with fire) but I forbid my followers to use cauterization (branding with fire)."

 Truffles 
Truffles have been cited within multiple hadiths for eye medicine. The Prophet Muhammad refers to them as 'Manna' in many of these hadiths. The word Manna means a form of sustenance granted by a divine source; this is often referred to in the context of the food the Israelites received in the Hebrew Bible.
 
“Truffles are 'Manna' which Allah, the Exalted the Majestic, sent to the people of Israil, and its juice is a medicine for the eye" 

Works

While the prominent works focused on treatment of the hadith related to health date from several centuries A.H., Sahih al-Bukhari and other earlier collections included these as well. 'Abd Allah b. Bustâm al-Nîsâbûrî's Tlbb al-a'imma, aggregating a legacy of several Shi’ite Imams, is widely considered to be the first known treatise on prophetic medicine, although it is rooted in a somewhat different cosmology. The canonical al-Bukhari corpus, divided into 97 books with 3,450 chapters, includes over a 100 traditions in its book, 76 loosely related to medicine, covering topics ranging from precautions against leprosy and epidemics to the forbidding of alcohol and suicide. The most notable works that still survive are attributed to religious scholars and largely not to Galenic physicians, although the latter are occasionally referenced.

Ibn Qayyim Al-Jawziyya in the 13th century produced one of the most influential works about prophetic medicine in his 277-chapter book, Al-Tibb al-Nabawiyy. Al-Jawziyya deals with a diversity of treatments as recommended by Muhammad but also engages with ethical concerns, discussing malpractice and the hallmarks of the competent doctor. Ethics of medical practice continue to be an important marker of Islamic medicine for some. Al-Jawziyya also elaborates on the relationship between medicine and religion.

A theologian renowned for his exegetical endeavors, Al-Suyuti also composed two works on prophetic medicine, one of which was on sexual relations as ordered by Muhammad. Al-Suyuti's other manuscript divides medicine into three types: traditional, spiritual and preventive (e.g. dietary regimen and exercise). Along with Al-Jawziyya, Al-Suyuti also included commentary that spoke to dealing with contagion and thus was relevant to the Black Death in the Islamic world. Ibn al-Khatib also addressed the Black Death and his belief in the contradiction between hadith and science regarding plagues, which may have led to his execution by strangulation for "heresy", although the court dealing with the case never reached a conclusive statement, and the event was recorded to have been largely influenced by the enemies of Ibn al-Khatib.

Both of the works above also address bioethical issues of abortion and conception, issues that, like the idea of Islamic medical heritage as being holistic, continue to be important in constructions of modern Islamic identity. Other notable works include those of Ibn Tulun (d. AD 1546) and Al-Dhahabi (d. AD 1348).

 Iran post-1970s 
Some clerics in Iran promote a controversial form of prophetic or "Islamic" medicine, based on sometimes rather unlikely quotations attributed to historic Muslim religious figures, and on Iranian traditional medicine.

Abbas Tabrizian, a prominent proponent, has faced official action for selling unapproved treatments; he has been widely criticized, and it thought to have few supporters. His burning of a copy of "Harrison's Principles of Internal Medicine", a medical reference book, was condemned by Grand Ayatollah Jafar Sobhani, who said that "insulting medical learning is against the spirit of Islam and Islam’s call for [learning] science... Criticizing the content [of a book] is appropriate, but [burning] is an act of ignorance, and many libraries were set on fire based on wrong motivations in the past". Ayatollah Alireza Arafi, who runs Irans seminaries, also condemned the book-burning. Abbas Tabrizian was widely ridiculed for a suggestion that COVID-19 could be prevented by applying a cotton ball soaked in violet oil to the anus. The IRNA news agency reported that Abbas Tabrizian, who has often promoted his remedies as "Islamic medicine" in opposition to standard medicine, has also claimed that COVID-19 is God's revenge against those who had bothered him.

An arrest warrant has been issued for Morteza Kohansal, a follower of Abbas Tabrizian who visited the coronavirus section of a hospital in Iran without wearing protective gear, and applied an unknown substance he described as "Prophet's Perfume" to patients.

Using "Islamic medicine" has caused some Iranian clerics to delay getting standard medical treatment. Ayatollah Hashem Bathaie Golpayegani announced that he had been infected by COVID-19, but had cured himself, three weeks before being hospitalized. He died two days later. Ayatollah Haeri-Shirazi and Ayatollah Mahmoud Hashemi Shahroudi were both also said by their families to have long delayed seeking standard medical, using "Islamic medicine" instead. Ayatollah Hashemi Shahroudi, who had been considered a possible successor Supreme Leader of Iran, died of cancer. His son Ala Shahroudi later said that "The so-called Islamic doctors had convinced my father to ignore what modern physicians said about his illness and how to treat it... My father underwent surgery in 2017. Supreme Leader, Ayatollah Ali Khamenei, secretly visited and advised him to ignore what the Islamic doctors say, and listen to the modern-day physicians... Nevertheless, my father ignored the leader's recommendation, and continued to trust the so-called Islamic Medicine experts."

See also
 Challenge of the Quran
 Commission on Scientific Signs in the Quran and Sunnah
 I'jaz
 Iranian traditional medicine
 Islamic attitudes towards science
 Islamic views on evolution
 Islamic view of miracles
 Medical Encyclopedia of Islam and Iran
 Medicine in the medieval Islamic world
 Miracles of Muhammad
 Muhammad ibn Zakariya al-Razi
 Quran and miracles
 Traditional Chinese medicine

References

Further reading
 Ghaly, Mohammed, Prophetic Medicine,'' in Muhammad in History, Thought, and Culture: An Encyclopedia of the Prophet of God (2 vols.), Edited by C. Fitzpatrick and A. Walker, Santa Barbara, ABC-CLIO, 2014, Vol. II, pp. 502–506.

External links
U.S. National Library of Medicine: Prophetic Medicine
International Institute of Islamic Medicine 

Medicine in the medieval Islamic world
Muhammad
Medieval Islamic world